The Galati-class cargo ship (as designated by NATO) is a is a class of cargo ship of the People's Republic of China's People's Liberation Army Navy. Two were converted in the early-1970s from nine ships built in the 1960s at the Santieral Shipyard in Galați, Romania.

Ships of the class

References

Auxiliary transport ship classes

Auxiliary ships of the People's Liberation Army Navy